Charles Grosvenor (born June 2, 1952) is an American film director.

Early work
Originally from Hillsdale, New Jersey, he moved to Los Angeles in 1978 to work in the animation industry, at a time when most of the work was still being done in the US. His first job was for Hanna-Barbera, as a model designer on The Buford Files. He soon joined the layout department and quickly advanced to crew chief, and ultimately to head of layout, thereby having a hand in every Hanna-Barbera show that was produced in those years, including Richie Rich and The Smurfs.

Evolving into direction
With Yogi's Treasure Hunt, Grosvenor made the move to directing. His success at that effort led to more directing assignments, including some of the first long form (an hour or more) animated shows, beginning with The Good, the Bad, and Huckleberry Hound. He graduated to feature film directing with Hanna-Barbera's Once Upon a Forest.

Current work
When Hanna-Barbera was absorbed by Warner Bros., Grosvenor moved to MGM, where he directed yet another incarnation of The Pink Panther as well as an animated feature based on Babes in Toyland. In 1997, he joined Universal Cartoon Studios (later renamed Universal Animation Studios), taking over the highly successful The Land Before Time direct-to-video series, beginning with The Land Before Time V: The Mysterious Island. As of 2006 he has produced and directed an additional seven sequels (The Land Before Time VII: The Stone of Cold Fire, The Land Before Time VIII: The Big Freeze, The Land Before Time IX: Journey to Big Water, The Land Before Time X: The Great Longneck Migration, The Land Before Time XI: Invasion of the Tinysauruses, and The Land Before Time XII: The Great Day of the Flyers), in addition to overseeing 26 half-hours of a television series based on the movies. While critical reception of the series has varied (many of the first sequels received lukewarm to negative reviews, while the latter sequels received more positive reviews), the series has gained a loyal fanbase.

Filmography

Television series

Film

References

External links 

1952 births
Living people
Animators from New Jersey
American storyboard artists
American animated film directors
Hanna-Barbera people
People from Hillsdale, New Jersey
Film directors from New Jersey